The AFL–CIO Employees Federal Credit Union is a multiple common bond, federally chartered credit union headquartered in Washington, D.C. The credit union was founded in 1952 for members of the AFL–CIO. It currently has two locations serving 9,723 members. AFL–CIO Employees FCU has assets of $76 million.  The most current annual report lists assets for Fiscal Year ending December 31, 2015, as $53.6 million.

The economic downturn of 2008 negatively affected the credit union with large losses in the first half of the year.

Membership
Employees of the AFL–CIO are eligible for membership in the credit union as are employees of affiliated AFL–CIO International Unions, constitutional departments of the AFL–CIO, and state or local central labor bodies. Eligibility is also extended to members of the Office and Professional Employees International Union – Local 2, the United Food and Commercial Workers – Local 400, the National Football League Players Association and the International Union of Painters and Allied Trades, District Council 51.

See also
 Amalgamated Bank of Chicago
 The Union Credit Union

References

External links
 AFL–CIO Employees Federal Credit Union website

Credit unions based in Washington, D.C.
AFL–CIO
Banks established in 1952